Sanjiv Arya is an Indian politician and member of Indian National Congress. He represented Nainital (Uttarakhand Assembly constituency) on a BJP ticket in the 4th Uttarakhand Assembly.

He also happens to be the son of the former speaker of Uttarakhand assembly Yashpal Arya. The father-son duo joined BJP a month ahead of the 2017 assembly elections in Uttarakhand in the presence of the then BJP National President Amit Shah.

On 11 October 2021, Sanjeev and his father joined the Congress party in the presence of party leaders Harish Rawat, Randeep Surjewala and KC Venugopal in Delhi.

References 

Year of birth missing (living people)
Living people
Bharatiya Janata Party politicians from Uttarakhand
Members of the Uttarakhand Legislative Assembly